Youth is a 2015 comedy-drama film written and directed by Paolo Sorrentino. It is the director's second English-language film, and stars Michael Caine and Harvey Keitel as best friends who reflect on their lives while holidaying in the Swiss Alps. It is a story of the eternal struggle between age and youth, the past and the future, life and death, commitment and betrayal. The cast also includes Rachel Weisz, Paul Dano, and Jane Fonda.

The film premiered at the 2015 Cannes Film Festival, where it competed for the Palme d'Or and had a positive critical response. At the 28th European Film Awards, Youth won Best Film, Best Director for Sorrentino, and Best Actor for Caine. It received one Academy Award nomination: Best Original Song, for David Lang's composition of "Simple Song #3". At the Golden Globe Awards, Lang was also nominated along with Jane Fonda for Best Supporting Actress.

Plot
Septuagenarian best friends Fred Ballinger and Mick Boyle are on vacation in the Swiss Alps, staying at a luxury spa/resort in Wiesen. Fred is a retired composer of classical music; at the hotel, he is approached by an emissary for Queen Elizabeth II, conferring a knighthood and asking him to perform his popular piece "Simple Song #3" at Prince Philip's birthday concert. Fred turns down the offer, claiming he is not interested in performing any more – although he still composes pieces in his head when alone. Mick is a film director, and is working with a group of writers to develop the screenplay for his latest film, which he calls his "testament". Also with them is actor Jimmy Tree, who is researching for an upcoming role and frustrated that he is only remembered for his role as a robot. The hotel is inhabited by other quirky individuals, including a young masseuse, an overweight Diego Maradona, and Miss Universe.

Fred and Mick reflect on their lives, admitting that their memories are fading and that they see little in their futures. Fred's daughter and assistant, Lena, is married to Mick's son, but the latter leaves her for pop star Paloma Faith. Lena stays at the resort and vents her anger at her father, who was always distant as she grew up. The emissary returns, and Lena cries as Fred explains that he won't perform "Simple Song #3" because the soprano part belongs only to his wife and she can no longer sing.

Mick completes his screenplay and is satisfied with it. The main role is written for aging diva Brenda Morel, who has starred in eleven of his previous films. Brenda surprises Mick by arriving at the resort, and telling him that she is taking a television role instead; cinema is the past, she says, and Mick hasn't made a good film in years. Disheartened, Mick commits suicide by jumping off a balcony in front of Fred. Fred decides to visit his wife for the first time in years. She is senile, and living at a care home in Venice. He then returns to the UK to conduct "Simple Song #3" in front of the Queen and Prince.

Interspersed throughout the film are surreal sequences, including a levitating monk, an imagined Paloma Faith music video, Jimmy dressed as Adolf Hitler, Fred conducting a field of cowbells, and Mick envisioning all his previous leading ladies on a mountaintop (including Brenda, in her new unglamorous TV role).

Cast

 Michael Caine as Fred Ballinger
 Harvey Keitel as Mick Boyle
 Rachel Weisz as Lena Ballinger
 Paul Dano as Jimmy Tree
 Jane Fonda as Brenda Morel
 Roly Serrano as Diego Maradona
 Alex Macqueen as Queen's emissary
 Ian Keir Attard as Queen's emissary assistant
 Luna Mijović as Young masseuse 
 Robert Seethaler as Luca Moroder
 Tom Lipinski as Screenwriter in Love
 Chloe Pirrie as Girl screenwriter
 Alex Beckett as Intellectual screenwriter
 Nate Dern as Funny screenwriter
 Mark Gessner as Shy screenwriter
 Ed Stoppard as Julian Boyle
 Paloma Faith as herself
 Mark Kozelek as himself
 Mădălina Diana Ghenea as Miss Universe Joyce Owens
 Sumi Jo as herself
 Viktoria Mullova as herself

Production

Youth is Sorrentino's second English-language film and the follow-up to his Academy Award-winning film The Great Beauty (2013). Principal photography began in Flims, Switzerland in May 2014. The primary location was the Waldhaus Flims, a 5-star hotel built in the nineteenth century, where the cast and crew all stayed while filming. Other scenes were filmed in Davos, Switzerland, particularly in the Hotel Schatzalp (the location of Thomas Mann's The Magic Mountain). Some filming was also done in Rome and Venice.

Sorrentino's regular cinematographer Luca Bigazzi returned to photograph the film. David Lang contributed in composing the film's music, including the piece "Simple Song #3" that is fictionally performed for Queen Elizabeth at the end. The scene was shot with soprano Sumi Jo, violinist Viktoria Mullova, the BBC Concert Orchestra, and the Berlin Radio Choir.

Michael Caine was coached for the role as conductor by the Italian composer and conductor Dimitri Scarlato.

Release
Youth premiered at the 2015 Cannes Film Festival, where it competed for the Palme d'Or, and was simultaneously released in Italy. The film was also selected for the Special Presentations section of the 2015 Toronto International Film Festival.Fox Searchlight distributed the film in the United States on 4 December 2015 in a limited release. It was released in the United Kingdom on 29 January 2016, by StudioCanal. By the end of its box office run, Youth had earned $24,035,045 worldwide.

Critical reception
Youth received positive reviews. The review aggregator website Rotten Tomatoes gives the film a 72% approval rating based on 212 reviews, with an average of 7 out of 10. The site's consensus reads, "Gorgeously filmed and beautifully acted, Youth offers an enticing – albeit flawed – opportunity to witness an impressive array of seasoned veterans combining their cinematic might." On Metacritic, the film has received a weighted average score of 64 out of 100 based on 41 critics, indicating "generally favorable reviews".

Kenneth Turan of the Los Angeles Times wrote, "Youth is a film that goes its own way. Quixotic, idiosyncratic, effortlessly moving, it's as much a cinematic essay as anything else, a meditation on the wonders and complications of life, an examination of what lasts, of what matters to people no matter their age." Todd McCarthy of The Hollywood Reporter called the film "a voluptuary's feast, a full-body immersion in the sensory pleasures of the cinema", and praised Caine and Keitel's performances. Jay Weissberg of Variety described it as Sorrentino's "most tender film to date, an emotionally rich contemplation of life's wisdom gained, lost, and remembered". In more mixed reviews, Robbie Collin of The Telegraph described the film as "gorgeous but chilly" and said it "never grasps its central theme", while Peter Bradshaw of The Guardian said it "has a wan eloquence and elegance, though freighted with sentimentality and a strangely unearned and uninteresting macho-geriatric regret for lost time."

Home media
Youth was released on DVD and Blu-ray in the United States on 1 March 2016.

Soundtrack
The soundtrack for Youth was released by Milan Records in December 2015. Among various songs the soundtrack also includes the opening track of the film "You Got The Love" performed by The Retrosettes, "Simple Song #3" composed by David Lang, as well as "Just (After Song of Songs)," also composed by David Lang.

Accolades

References

External links
 
  Youth at BFI
  Youth at British Council–Film
  Youth at Lumiere
 
 
 
 

2015 films
2010s buddy comedy-drama films
British buddy comedy-drama films
French comedy-drama films
Italian buddy comedy films
Italian comedy-drama films
Swiss comedy-drama films
Bisexuality-related films
2010s English-language films
English-language French films
English-language Swiss films
English-language Italian films
Films about composers
Films about filmmaking
Films about old age
Beauty pageants in fiction
Films about beauty queens
Miss Universe
Films set in Switzerland
Davos in fiction
Films shot in Italy
Films shot in London
Films shot in Switzerland
Films shot in Venice
Fox Searchlight Pictures films
2010s Spanish-language films
Films directed by Paolo Sorrentino
Films produced by Elizabeth Karlsen
Number 9 Films films
StudioCanal films
European Film Awards winners (films)
2015 comedy films
2015 drama films
Films with screenplays by Paolo Sorrentino
2010s British films
2010s French films